Richard Kunzmann (born 1976) is a Namibian born novelist, predominantly of crime fiction. He grew up in South Africa. His first novel, Bloody Harvests, in a murder mystery set in South Africa and features SAPS detectives Harry Mason and Jacob Tsahbalala. It was first published in 2004, and features a conspiracy involving a grisly series of homicides in which the victims' bodies are used to make muti (traditional medicine.) Two other novels, Salamander Cotton and Dead-End Road feature the same characters.

References

1976 births
South African male novelists
Living people
Namibian people of German descent
Namibian emigrants to South Africa
Alumni of Pretoria Boys High School